Cychry  (German Zicher) is a village in the administrative district of Gmina Dębno, within Myślibórz County, West Pomeranian Voivodeship, in north-western Poland.

The village has a population of 991.

References

Cychry